People to People can refer to:

 People to People International, a non-profit group and recipient of the Knight of Peace Award
 The People to People Student Ambassador Program, the student travel group associated with the above organization
People to People (EP), 2018 DNCE EP

See also
"People Are People", Depeche Mode single